The Deadly Dream is an American made-for-television thriller-drama film starring Lloyd Bridges and Janet Leigh. It premiered as the ABC Movie of the Week on September 25, 1971.

Plot
A scientist has reoccurring dreams in which he is pursued by a mysterious tribunal for something that he's not aware that he's done. He comes to realize that his dreams may have become his reality.

Cast
Lloyd Bridges as Dr Jim Hanley
Janet Leigh as Laurel Hanley
Carl Betz as Dr Howard Geary
Leif Erickson as Dr Harold Malcolm
Don Stroud as Kagan
Richard Jaeckel as Delgreve
Phillip Pine as Dr Farrow
Herbert Nelson as Dr Goodman 
Arlene Dahl as Connie

Reception
The Los Angeles Times said the film "Leaves you guessing at the end as much as the beginning."

References

External links
The Deadly Dream at IMDb
The Deadly Dream at BFI
The Deadly Dream at TCMDB

1971 films
1971 television films
1970s thriller drama films
American thriller drama films
Films directed by Alf Kjellin
Films scored by Dave Grusin
1971 drama films
1970s English-language films
1970s American films